Thomas Christopher Wright (born October 14, 1957) is an American businessman, cannabis rights and free speech activist, and frequent candidate for public office. Wright, who co-founded the Grassroots Party in 1986, owns a computer repair shop in Bloomington, Minnesota.

Activism
Chris Wright organized the Minnesota Tea Party, a cannabis rights rally held on the steps of the Minnesota State Capitol every September from 1987 to 2013.

A political rally and music festival called Grassroots Gathering, organized by Wright in 1992, which was to be held on a private campground near Ogilvie, Minnesota, was cancelled by authorities citing incidents reported at the Weedstock festival in Wisconsin the previous year.

Wright was arrested in 1996 for growing 41 cannabis plants at his home in Minneapolis. He appealed the conviction and lost. Wright argued that under Art. XIII, Sec. 7 of the Minnesota Constitution any person may sell the products of the farm or garden occupied by him without obtaining a license. The Minnesota Court of Appeals reasoned that product labeling, and other restrictions established previously, granted police authority to ban cannabis.

Wright ran for U.S. Representative for Minnesota's 5th congressional district in 1988 as a Grassroots candidate. In 1998, Wright was endorsed by the Grassroots Party for Governor of Minnesota. He got 1,727 votes. In the 2010 Minnesota gubernatorial election, Wright got 7,516 votes as a Grassroots candidate. In 2014, Wright got 31,259 votes for Governor as a Grassroots—Legalize Cannabis candidate.

Wright was nominated by petition to run for Governor of Minnesota in 2018 as a Grassroots—Legalize Cannabis Party candidate.

In 2022, Chris Wright resigned as chair of G—LC, a post Wright held for years, to seek Minnesota Legal Marijuana Now Party nomination for Governor. Wright was eliminated in the primary, receiving 48% of the party’s vote.

In addition to legalizing drugs, Wright promotes using hydrogen as fuel.

Political candidacy
A founding member of the Grassroots Party in 1986, Chris Wright ran as their candidate, between 1988 and 2010, three times. In 2014, Wright and Oliver Steinberg formed the Minnesota Grassroots—Legalize Cannabis Party, and Wright has also run as their candidate several times, including:
United States Representative from Minnesota's 5th Congressional District in 1988
Governor of Minnesota in 1998, 2010, 2014, and 2018
State Senator from Minnesota's 63rd Legislative District in 2020

Notes

References

 Associated Press (May 17, 1992). "Judge nixes music festival near Ogilvie". St. Paul Pioneer Press.
 Associated Press (December 23, 1998). "Right to peddle produce doesn't include pot, court rules". Star Tribune.
 Condon, Patrick (June 21, 2014). "Pot activists light up Minnesota ballot". Star Tribune.
 Davis, Don (October 4, 2010). "Dayton, Emmer, Horner not only Minnesota governor candidates on ballot". Grand Forks Herald.
 Donovan, Lisa (August 31, 2000). "Grassroots Party Having Quarrel with City Officials: Security Requests Holding Up Permits For Sept. 16 Rally". St. Paul Pioneer Press.
 Doyle, Pat (May 16, 1992). "Judge blocks large Grassroots fest near Ogilvie". Star Tribune, p. 1B.
 Gilyard, Burl (July 5, 1995). "Doobie Brothers: Grassroots Party members grapple with their budding political clout". Twin Cities Reader, p. 1.
 Mosedale, Mike (October 3, 2014). "A crowded field of pot advocates". Politics in Minnesota Capitol Report.
 Pecka, Benjamin (May 10, 2017). "Politicians and citizens implore Minnesotans to legalize marijuana at 420 rally". City College News.
 Pugmire, Tim (September 11, 2014). "Minnesota's candidates for governor divided on marijuana laws". Minnesota Public Radio.
 Scheck, Tom (October 21, 2014). "Sharp focus, few votes for Cannabis, Libertarian governor hopefuls". Minnesota Public Radio.

Further reading
 "State of Minnesota, Respondent, vs. Thomas Christopher Wright, Appellant, C4-98-179". File No. 96075200: Minnesota Court of Appeals. December 22, 1998.

External links
 

1957 births
Living people
American cannabis activists
Free speech activists
Grassroots Party politicians
People convicted of cannabis offenses
People from Minnesota
American political party founders
Candidates in the 2018 United States elections